Chaetoceros is probably the largest genus of marine planktonic diatoms with approximately 400 species described, although many of these descriptions are no longer valid. It is often very difficult to distinguish between different Chaetoceros species. Several attempts have been made to restructure this large genus into subgenera and this work is still in progress. However, most of the effort to describe species has been focused in boreal areas, and the genus is cosmopolitan, so there are probably many tropical species still undescribed. Some species are known from the fossil record, from the Quaternary of Sweden. It is the type genus of its family.

Description
The genus Chaetoceros were first described by Ehrenberg in 1844.
Cells are more or less rectangular in girdle view.
Cells are usually elliptical in valve view.
Opposite setae of adjacent cells touch near their origin.

Each frustule has four siliceous processes called mushrooms or thorns that allow them to stay together forming colonies.

Chaetoceros is primarily a marine genus, but there are also accounts of species within inland waters of the United States. It is a type of centric diatom that contains a frustrule or cell wall composed of silica that contain long, thin spines (setae). The spines connect the frustules together creating a colony of cells. Cells colonies can form chains that are coiled, straight, or curved. Cell size can range from <10 um to 50 um.

Environmental ranges
Depth range (m): 0–470
Temperature range (°C): -1.952–29.468
Nitrate (μmol L-1): 0.053 - 34.037
Salinity: 18.564 - 37.775
Oxygen (mL L-1): 4.139 - 9.192
Phosphate (μmol L-1): 0.046 - 2.358
Silicate (μmol L-1): 0.648 - 92.735

Beneficial effects
Due to its high growth rates, research has been conducted to potentially use of Chaetoceros in biotechnology. Some Chaetoceros species are well-established commercial aquacultures. Many of them are recognized as generally good producers of useful lipids and other biologically active products with high value-added. They have enormous potential for producing nutraceuticals and biofuel.

Studies suggest that colonies of Chaetoceros serve as an important food source within the water column and major carbon contributor to the benthic environment. Within the North Water, located in northern Baffin Bay, Chaetoceros has been reported to contribute about 91% of total phytoplankton cells serving as an important primary producer within this area. Therefore, contributing to  oxygen production in the North Water. Overall, phytoplankton contributes to over half of Earth's oxygen production.

Blooms 
Chaetoceros blooms have been reported to reach concentrations of 30,100 cells/ml and can persist for multiple months. Blooms are able to persist because individuals can survive at low nutrient levels. When present in large quantities, species with larger, thicker spines can damage organisms' gills. Although, this defensive trait can help the species avoid predation and further promote bloom success. Overall, intensive development of the species of the genus Chaetoceros in the Arctic Ocean has a significant impact on the biogeochemical cycle of organic carbon and silicon, as well as on a wide range of macronutrients, trace and rare earth elements.

Some currently accepted Chaetoceros species

Chaetoceros abnormis A.I. Proshkina-Lavrenko
Chaetoceros aculeatus I.V. Makarova
Chaetoceros adelianus E.E. Manguin
Chaetoceros aduncus I.N. Sukhanova
Chaetoceros aequatorialis var. antarcticus Manguin
Chaetoceros aequatorialis Cleve
Chaetoceros affinis f. pseudosymmetricus (E. Steemann Nielsen) M. Torrington-Smith
Chaetoceros affinis f. parallelus M. Thorrington-Smith
Chaetoceros affinis f. inaequalis M. Thorrington-Smith
Chaetoceros affinis Lauder
Chaetoceros amanita A. Cleve-Euler
Chaetoceros anastomosans Grunow
Chaetoceros angularis Schütt
Chaetoceros angulatus F. Schütt
Chaetoceros anostomosans var. speciosus F. Schütt
Chaetoceros armatus T. West
Chaetoceros astrabadicus A. Henckel
Chaetoceros atlanticus var. compactus (F. Schütt) P.T. Cleve
Chaetoceros atlanticus var. neapolitanus (Schroeder)  Hustedt
Chaetoceros atlanticus var. tumescens A. Grunow
Chaetoceros atlanticus Cleve
Chaetoceros atlanticus f. audax (F. Schütt) H.H. Gran
Chaetoceros atlanticus var. cruciatus (G. Karsten) M. Thorrington-Smith
Chaetoceros audax F. Schütt
Chaetoceros bacteriastrius G.C. Wallich
Chaetoceros bacteriastroides f. imbricatus (L.A. Mangin) M. Thorrington-Smith
Chaetoceros bacteriastroides G.H.H. Karsten
Chaetoceros bermejense D. U. Hernández-Becerril
Chaetoceros bisetaceus J. Schumann
Chaetoceros borealis J.W. Bailey
Chaetoceros borealoides H.L. Honigmann
Chaetoceros breve F. Schütt
Chaetoceros brevis Schütt
Chaetoceros brussilowi A. Henckel
Chaetoceros buceros G.H.H. Karsten
Chaetoceros buceros Karsten
Chaetoceros bulbosus (Ehrenberg) Heiden
Chaetoceros bulbosus f. cruciatus (G. Karsten) H. Heiden
Chaetoceros bulbosus f. schimperana (G. Karsten) H. Heiden
Chaetoceros bungei Honigmann
Chaetoceros calcitrans (Paulsen) Takano, 1968 (or synonym of Chaetoceros simplex var. calcitrans Paulsen, 1905)
Chaetoceros calcitrans f. pumilus TakanoChaetoceros californicus A. GrunowChaetoceros capense G.H.H. KarstenChaetoceros caspicus C.E.H. Ostenfeld
Chaetoceros caspicus var. karianus A. Henckel
Chaetoceros caspicus f. pinguichaetus A. Henckel & P. HenckelChaetoceros castracanei KarstenChaetoceros castracanei G.H.H. Karsten
Chaetoceros ceratospermus var. minor A.F. Meunier
Chaetoceros ceratosporus var. brachysetus Rines & HargravesChaetoceros ceratosporus OstenfeldChaetoceros chunii G.H.H. KarstenChaetoceros cinctus GranChaetoceros clavigera C.E.H. OstenfeldChaetoceros clavigerus A. GrunowChaetoceros clevei F. SchüttChaetoceros coarctatus LauderChaetoceros cochleus F. SchüttChaetoceros compactus F. Schütt
Chaetoceros compressus var. gracilis F. Hustedt
Chaetoceros compressus var. hirtisetus J.E.B. Rines & P.E. HargravesChaetoceros concavicorne ManginChaetoceros confervoides J. RalfsChaetoceros confusus S.L. VanLandinghamChaetoceros constrictus GranChaetoceros convolutus Castracane
Chaetoceros convolutus f. trisetosus Brunel
Chaetoceros convolutus f. volans L.I. SmirnovaChaetoceros cornutus G. Leuduger-FortmorelChaetoceros coronatus GranChaetoceros costatus PavillardChaetoceros crenatus (C.G. Ehrenberg) T. BrightwellChaetoceros crinitus SchüttChaetoceros criophilus CastracaneChaetoceros cruciatus G.H.H. KarstenChaetoceros curvatus CastracaneChaetoceros curvisetus CleveChaetoceros dadayi PavillardChaetoceros danicus CleveChaetoceros debilis Cleve
Chaetoceros decipiens f. singularis H.H. GranChaetoceros decipiens CleveChaetoceros delicatulus C.E.H. OstenfeldChaetoceros densus CleveChaetoceros diadema (Ehrenberg) Gran
Chaetoceros dichaeta f. unicellularis H. HeidenChaetoceros dichaetus Ehrenberg
Chaetoceros dichaetus var. polygonus (F. Schütt) H. Heiden
Chaetoceros didymus var. praelongus E.J. Lemmermann
Chaetoceros didymus f. aestivus H.H. Gran
Chaetoceros didymus f. autumnalis H.H. GranChaetoceros didymus C.G. EhrenbergChaetoceros difficilis CleveChaetoceros distichus F. SchüttChaetoceros distinguendus E.J. LemmermannChaetoceros diversicurvatus Van Goor
Chaetoceros diversus var. mediterraneus J.L.B. SchröderChaetoceros diversus CleveChaetoceros eibenii (Grunow) MeunierChaetoceros elmorei BoyerChaetoceros elongatus HonigmannChaetoceros exospermus MeunierChaetoceros externus GranChaetoceros fallax Prosckina-LavrenkoChaetoceros femur F. SchüttChaetoceros filiferus G.H.H. KarstenChaetoceros filiforme MeunierChaetoceros flexuosus ManginChaetoceros fragilis Meunier
[[Chaetoceros furca var. macroceras|Chaetoceros furca var. macroceras]] J.L.B. Schröder
Chaetoceros furcellatus J.W. Bailey
Chaetoceros fusus F. Schütt
Chaetoceros galvestonense Collier & Murphy
Chaetoceros gastridius (C.G. Ehrenberg) T. Brightwell
Chaetoceros gaussii Heiden & Kolbe
Chaetoceros gracialis A. Henckel
Chaetoceros glandazii Mangin
Chaetoceros gobii A. Henckel
Chaetoceros gracilis Pantocsek
Chaetoceros grunowii F. Schütt
Chaetoceros hendeyi Manguin
Chaetoceros hispidus var. monicae A. Grunow
Chaetoceros hohnii Graebn. & Wujek
Chaetoceros holsaticus Schütt
Chaetoceros ikari B.V. Skvortzov
Chaetoceros imbricatus Mangin
Chaetoceros incurvus var. umbonatus Castracane
Chaetoceros incurvus Bailey
Chaetoceros indicus Karsten
Chaetoceros ingolfianus Ostenfeld
Chaetoceros intermedius A. Henckel
Chaetoceros karianus Grunow
Chaetoceros karyanus A. Henckel
Chaetoceros knipowitschii A. Henckel
Chaetoceros laciniosus Schüt
Chaetoceros laciniosus f. protuberans M. Thorrington-Smith
Chaetoceros laciniosus f. pelagicus H.H. Gran
Chaetoceros lauderi Ralfs
Chaetoceros leve F. Schütt
Chaetoceros littorale litorale E.J. Lemmermann
Chaetoceros lorenzianus var. forceps A.F. Meunier
Chaetoceros lorenzianus Grunow
Chaetoceros malygini A. Henckel
Chaetoceros medius F. Schütt C
Chaetoceros meridiana (F. Schütt) G. Karsten
Chaetoceros mertensii H.L. Honigmann
Chaetoceros messanense Castracane C
Chaetoceros minimus (Levander) D. Marino, G. Giuffre, M. Montresor & A. Zingone
Chaetoceros misumensis H.H. Gran & K. Yendo
Chaetoceros mitra (J.W. Bailey) Cleve
Chaetoceros muelleri var. duplex E.J. Lemmermann
Chaetoceros muelleri var. subsalsum J.R. Johansen & S. Rushforth
Chaetoceros muelleri E.J. Lemmermann
Chaetoceros muellerii var. subsalsus J.R. Johansen & Rushforth
Chaetoceros nansenii A. Henckel
Chaetoceros natatus E.E. Manguin
Chaetoceros neglectus Karsten
Chaetoceros neobulbosus T.V. Desikachary, S. Gowthaman & Y. Latha
Chaetoceros neocompactus S.L. VanLandingham
Chaetoceros neogracile S.L. VanLandingham
Chaetoceros neupokojewii A. Henckel
Chaetoceros nipponicus J. Ikari
Chaetoceros odontella (C.G. Ehrenberg) G.L. Rabenhorst
Chaetoceros okamurae var. tetrasetus J. Ikari
Chaetoceros okamurae J. Ikari
Chaetoceros ostenfeldii P.T. Cleve
Chaetoceros pachtussowii A. Henckel
Chaetoceros pachyceros R. Margalef
Chaetoceros pacificus J. Ikari
Chaetoceros paradoxus Cleve
Chaetoceros paradoxus var. luedersii Engler
Chaetoceros parvus F. Schütt
Chaetoceros paulsenii f. robustus A. Henckel
Chaetoceros pavillardii J. Ikari
Chaetoceros pelagicus
Chaetoceros pendulus Karsten
Chaetoceros perpusillus Cleve
Chaetoceros peruvianus var. victoriae Karsten
Chaetoceros peruvianus var. gracilis J.L.B. Schröder
Chaetoceros peruvianus Brightwell
Chaetoceros peruvianus var. robustum P.T. Cleve
Chaetoceros peruvianus var. suadivae Karsten
Chaetoceros peruvianus f. volans (F. Schütt) C.E.H. Ostenfeld
Chaetoceros peruvianus f. robustus (P.T. Cleve) C.E.H. Ostenfeld
Chaetoceros phuketensis J.E.B. Rines, P. Boonruang & E.C. Theriot
Chaetoceros pingue A. Henckel
Chaetoceros pinguichaetus A. Henckel & P. Henckel
Chaetoceros pliocenus J.-J. Brun
Chaetoceros protuberans H.S. Lauder
Chaetoceros pseudoaurivillii J. Ikari
Chaetoceros pseudocrinitus Ostenfeld
Chaetoceros pseudocurvisetus Mangin
Chaetoceros pseudodichaeta J. Ikari
Chaetoceros pundulus G.H.H. Karsten
Chaetoceros radians F. Schütt
Chaetoceros radicans F. Schütt
Chaetoceros recurvatus f. robustus Henckel
Chaetoceros recurvatus Henckel
Chaetoceros robustus (P.T. Cleve) C.E.H. Ostenfeld
Chaetoceros rostratus Lauder
Chaetoceros russanowi A. Henckel
Chaetoceros salsugineus Takano
Chaetoceros saltans P.T. Cleve
Chaetoceros schmidtii C.E.H. Ostenfeld
Chaetoceros schuettii f. oceanicus H.H. Gran
Chaetoceros secundus P.T. Cleve
Chaetoceros seiracanthus Gran
Chaetoceros sessile Grøntved
Chaetoceros setoense J. Ikari
Chaetoceros seychellarus G.H.H. Karsten
Chaetoceros seychellarus var. austral E.E. Manguin
Chaetoceros siamense C.E.H. Ostenfeld
Chaetoceros similis Cleve
Chaetoceros simplex C.E.H. Ostenfeld C
Chaetoceros skeleton F. Schütt
Chaetoceros socialis f. radians (F. Schütt) A.I. Proshkina-Lavrenko
Chaetoceros socialis Lauder
Chaetoceros socialis var. autumnalis Prosckina-Lavrenko
Chaetoceros sedowii A. Henckel
Chaetoceros strictus G.H.H. Karsten
Chaetoceros subcompressus J.L.B. Schröder
Chaetoceros subsalsus Lemmermann
Chaetoceros subsecundus (Grunow ex Van Heurck)  Hustedt
Chaetoceros subtilis Cleve
Chaetoceros sumatranus Karsten
Chaetoceros tenuissimus A.F. Meunier
Chaetoceros teres f. spinulosus H.H. Gran
Chaetoceros teres Cleve
Chaetoceros tetrachaeta Ehrenberg
Chaetoceros tetras G.H.H. Karsten
Chaetoceros tetrastichon Cleve
Chaetoceros thienemannii  Hustedt
Chaetoceros throndsenii var. trisetosus Zingone
Chaetoceros throndsenii var. throndsenia D. Marino, M. Montresor & A. Zingone
Chaetoceros throndsenii (Marino, Montresor, & Zingone) Marino, Montresor & Zingone
Chaetoceros tortissimus H.H. Gran
Chaetoceros transisetus J.R. Johansen & J.S. Boyer
Chaetoceros vanheurckii H.H. Gran
Chaetoceros vermiculus F. Schütt
Chaetoceros villosus Kützing
Chaetoceros vistulae C. Apstein
Chaetoceros volans F. Schütt
Chaetoceros weissflogii F. Schütt
Chaetoceros wighamii Brightwell
Chaetoceros willei Grunow
Chaetoceros zachariasi var. longus H.L. Honigmann
Chaetoceros zachariasii var. variatus H.L. Honigmann
Chaetoceros zachariasii var. latus H.L. Honigmann
Chaetoceros zachariasii Honigmann
Chaetoceros ziwolkii A. Henckel

See also
 Viruses associated with Chaetoceros species
 Chaetoceros tenuissimus RNA virus 01
 Chaetoceros salsugineum DNA virus 01
 Chaetoceros socialis f. radians RNA virus 01

References

External links
 Algaebase
 C.H. von Quillfeldt article
 Rines 2000 article
 Index Nominum Algarum
 Catalogue of Diatom Names, California Academy of Sciences
 Chaetoceros at fossilworks

Diatom genera
Coscinodiscophyceae